East Island is a granite island, with an area of 12.42 ha, in south-eastern Australia.  It is part of Tasmania’s Hogan Group, lying in northern Bass Strait between the Furneaux Group and Wilsons Promontory in Victoria.

Fauna
Recorded breeding seabird and wader species include little penguin, short-tailed shearwater, fairy prion, common diving petrel, Pacific gull and sooty oystercatcher.  Reptiles present include White's skink and metallic skink.

Wrecks
 Daphne (brig) in 1818.

See also

 List of islands of Tasmania

References

Hogan Group